Soarin' Eagle is a steel roller coaster located at the Scream Zone at Luna Park in Coney Island, Brooklyn, New York. The ride was the first ever Zamperla "Volare" roller coaster when it opened in 2002 at Elitch Gardens in Denver, Colorado, as the Flying Coaster. The Elitch Gardens ride was constructed by Martin & Vleminckx. The Volare, the cheapest option for a flying roller coaster, contains a compact layout with a distinctive spiral lift hill. In late 2010 the ride got dismantled and relocated to Luna Park in Coney Island, where it opened in April 2011 as the Soarin' Eagle. The ride has an identical sister, Hero, which opened in July 2013 at Flamingo Land in North Yorkshire.

Layout

Riders begin their experience of the Soarin' Eagle by boarding the four-across trains as they pass slowly along a moving walkway. The trains are originally upright so riders can walk up from behind and enter from a standing position. Each rider must select their desired height on a five rung series of ladder-like steps which determine how a rider will be positioned when the train tilts to the horizontal position upon leaving the station. Before departure, a cage is latched down over the backs of the trains to secure the riders for the duration of the trip. The train then heads up the spiral lift hill, which slowly twirls the train upward. After the lift, the train then heads down a short, steep drop and then ascends slowly back up. A hairpin turn then occurs and takes riders through the first Barrel Roll inversion. The train then hits another hairpin turn into another short drop. Another hairpin turn then leads the train into the second Barrel Roll and turns again.

The train is then slowed by the trim brakes and then twists through another set of hairpin turns and twists until the train slows by the final brake run. The train enters the station and completes the experience.

See also
 2011 in amusement parks

References

External links
 Soarin' Eagle at the Roller Coaster DataBase

Coney Island
Roller coasters in New York (state)
Roller coasters introduced in 2011
Roller coasters operated by Herschend Family Entertainment
2011 establishments in New York (state)